Passionate Love is a 2013 South Korean weekend television drama series starring Sung Hoon and Choi Yoon-young. It aired on SBS from September 28, 2013 to March 23, 2014 on Saturdays and Sundays at 20:45 for 47 episodes.

Plot
Both handsome and rich, Kang Moo-yeol has it all until the love of his life, Han Yoo-rim, passes away. Yoo-rim's younger sister, Han Yoo-jung also struggles with the loss, forcing her to grow up as an independent person with a no-nonsense attitude. In a twist of fate, these two meet and find that they are linked by more than just the loss of Yoo-rim. Bound by the tragedy of their parents' pasts, these star-crossed lovers will find out if their love alone is strong enough to persevere, or if it really isn't meant to be.

Cast

Main characters
 Sung Hoon as Kang Moo-yeol
 Lee Won-keun as young Moo-yeol
 Choi Yoon-young as Han Yoo-jung
 Lee Hye-in as young Yoo-jung
 Shim Ji-ho as Han Soo-hyuk
 Yeo Eui-joo as Hong Soo-hyuk
 Jun Kwang-ryul as Kang Moon-do
 Hwang Shin-hye as Hong Nan-cho
 Jeon Mi-seon as Yang Eun-sook

Supporting characters
 People around Moo-yeol
 Joo Hyun as Yang Tae-shin
 Jin Seo-yeon as Kang Moon-hee
 Kang Seo-joon as Park Jong-hyuk
 Yoon Mi-ra as Jang Bok-hee
 Woo Hee-jin as Yang Hye-sook
 Oh Dae-gyu as Yoo Min-soo

 People around Yoo-jung
 Seohyun as Han Yoo-rim (ep 1–5) 
 Kang Shin-il as Han Sung-bok
 Song Chae-hwan as Song Kyung-hee
 Lee Han-wi as Ban Soo-bong
 Jeon Soo-kyeong as Joo Nam-ok
 Kim Yoon-seo as Ban Dal
 Lee Jung-hyuk as Ban Tae-yang
 Kim Hye-ji as Cha Mi-rae

References

External links
  
 
 

Seoul Broadcasting System television dramas
2013 South Korean television series debuts
2014 South Korean television series endings
Korean-language television shows
South Korean romance television series
South Korean melodrama television series
Television series by Pan Entertainment